David Gilmour (born 1946) is an English guitarist and member of Pink Floyd.

Dave Gilmour or David Gilmour may also refer to:
 Dave Gilmour (ice hockey, born 1881) (1881–1932), Canadian hockey player for the Ottawa Silver Seven
 Dave Gilmour (ice hockey, born 1950), major league ice hockey player for the Calgary Cowboys
 David Gilmour (businessman) (born 1931), founder of Fiji Water
 David Gilmour (trade unionist) (died 1926), British trade unionist and politician
 David Gilmour (writer) (born 1949), Canadian writer and television journalist
 David Gilmour (historian) (born 1952), Scottish author
 David R. Gilmour (born 1958), American diplomat
 David Gilmour (album), the first solo album by David Gilmour (1978)

See also
 David Gilmore (born 1964), jazz guitarist
 David Gilmour Blythe (1815–1865), American artist
 David Gillmore, Baron Gillmore of Thamesfield (1934–1999), British diplomat

Gilmour, David